Leadville North is a census-designated place (CDP) in and governed by Lake County, Colorado, United States. The population of the Leadville North CDP was 1,794 at the United States Census 2010. The Leadville post office (Zip Code 80461) serves the area.

Geography
Leadville North is bordered to the south by the City of Leadville, the county seat.

U.S. Route 24 forms the eastern edge of the community. The highway leads north  over the Continental Divide to Interstate 70 (I-70) at Minturn, and it runs south through Leadville  to Buena Vista. Colorado State Highway 91 has its southern terminus in Leadville North and leads north-northeast  to I-70 at Copper Mountain.

Demographics

See also

 List of census-designated places in Colorado

References

External links

 Leadville, Colorado
 Leadville @ Colorado.com
 Leadville @ UncoverColorado.com
 Leadville Lake County Chamber of Commerce
 Lake County website

Census-designated places in Lake County, Colorado
Census-designated places in Colorado